Berberis pavoniana is a species of plant in the family Berberidaceae. It is endemic to Ecuador. Its natural habitat is subtropical or tropical high-altitude grassland.

References

Endemic flora of Ecuador
pavoniana
Data deficient plants
Taxonomy articles created by Polbot